George Swanston (born 19 November 1950) is a Trinidad and Tobago athlete. He competed in the men's long jump at the 1976 Summer Olympics.

References

1950 births
Living people
Athletes (track and field) at the 1976 Summer Olympics
Trinidad and Tobago male long jumpers
Olympic athletes of Trinidad and Tobago
Athletes (track and field) at the 1971 Pan American Games
Athletes (track and field) at the 1975 Pan American Games
Pan American Games competitors for Trinidad and Tobago
Place of birth missing (living people)